Public School No. 37, also known as Patrick Henry School and Primary School No. 37, is a historic elementary school located at Baltimore, Maryland, United States. It is an elaborately detailed -story Georgian Revival structure. The entrance portico has six freestanding columns, rustication at the base, lintels, and quoins, and a large slate-shingled hip roof.  It was built in 1896 for $25,000.

Public School No. 37 was listed on the National Register of Historic Places in 1979.

References

External links
, including photo from 1978, at Maryland Historical Trust

Broadway East, Baltimore
Defunct schools in Maryland
Public schools in Baltimore
School buildings on the National Register of Historic Places in Baltimore
School buildings completed in 1896
Georgian Revival architecture in Maryland
Colonial Revival architecture in Maryland